was a feudal domain under the Tokugawa shogunate of Edo period Japan, in Musashi Province (modern-day Saitama Prefecture), Japan. It was centered on Iwatsuki Castle in what is now part of Iwatsuki-ku, Saitama.

History
Iwatsuki was an important strongpoint of the Odawara Hojo clan. However, following the destruction of that clan at the Battle of Odawara of 1590, the territory came under the control of Tokugawa Ieyasu, who assigned a 20,000 koku domain to one of his most trusted retainers, Kōriki Kiyonaga. Following the Siege of Osaka, his grandson Kōriki Tadafusa was awarded with a promotion to the 35,000 koku Hamamatsu Domain in 1619.
The following year, in 1620, the rōjū Aoyama Tadatoshi was awarded Iwatsuki with holdings of 55,000 koku. He subsequently fell from favor and was demoted to the 20,000 koku Ōtaki Domain in 1623.

Abe Masatsugu was transferred to Iwatsuki in 1638 from Odawara Domain. The Abe clan ruled Iwatsuki over the next five generations until 1681, gradually increasing their holdings to 95,000 koku. After their transfer to Miyazu Domain, they were replaced by Itakura Shigetane (1681-1682), Toda Tadamasa (1682-1686), Matsudaira Tadachika (1696-1697) Ogasawara Nagashige (1697-1710) and his son Ogasawara Nagahiro (1710-1711).

The Nagai clan was then awarded Iwatsuki, beginning with Nagai Naohiro in 1711 and lasting for three generations until the clan was transferred to Kanō Domain in 1756.

Ōoka Tadamitsu (1709–1760), a distant relative of Ōoka Tadasuke who had started as a 300 koku hatamoto, rose rapidly through the ranks and was eventually awarded Iwatsuki and 20,000 koku in 1756. His descendants remained at Iwatsuki until the Meiji Restoration. The final daimyō of Iwatsuki, Ōoka Tadatsura (1847–1920) sided with the pro-imperial forces in the Boshin War and made a viscount (shishaku) in the kazoku peerage system in the Meiji period.

The domain had a population of 38,404 people in 6,962 households per a census in 1870.

Holdings at the end of the Edo period
As with most domains in the han system, Iwatsuki Domain consisted of several discontinuous territories calculated to provide the assigned kokudaka, based on periodic cadastral surveys and projected agricultural yields.
Musashi Province
1 village in Adachi District
2 villages in Katsushika District
3 villages in Tama District
56 villages in Saitama District
1 village in Hiki District
7 villages in Koma District
1 village in Hara District
Awa Province
9 villages in Nagasa District
1 village in Asai District
Kazusa Province
8 villages in Ichihara District
1 village in Mōta District
69 villages in Isumi District
1 village in Nagara District
4 villages in Yamabe District
Shimōsa Province
4 villages in Katsushika District
Yamashiro Province
1 village in Sōraku District
Hitachi Province
1 village in Niihari District
Kōzuke Province
5 villages in Seta District
2 villages in Nawa District

List of daimyō

References

External links
 Iwatsuki on "Edo 300 HTML"

Notes

Domains of Japan
1871 disestablishments in Japan
States and territories disestablished in 1871
Musashi Province
History of Saitama Prefecture
Abe clan
Fujii-Matsudaira clan
Itakura clan
Ogasawara clan